Polish Radio Experimental Studio - PRES (Polish: Studio Eksperymentalne Polskiego Radia) was an experimental music studio  in Warsaw, where electronic and utility pieces were recorded. The studio was established in 1957 and operated until 2004. Composers such as Krzysztof Penderecki, Elżbieta Sikora, Włodzimierz Kotoński, and Bohdan Mazurek created in the studio.

History 
The establishment of the Polish Radio Experimental Studio was conceived by Włodzimierz Sokorski, head of the Radio and Television Committee. Between 1952 and 1956 he was a Minister of Culture, and as a strong supporter of socialist realism he fought against any manifestations of modernity in music. The Polish Radio Experimental Studio was founded on the 15th of November 1957, but only in the second half of the following year was it adapted for sound production. It operated until 2004.

Until 1985, for 28 years the studio was headed by its founder - Józef Patkowski – musicologist, acoustician, and the chairman of the Polish Composers’ Union. The second most important person in the Studio was Krzysztof Szlifirski, an electro-acoustics engineer. Before founding the studio Józef Patkowski visited similar hubs in Cologne, Paris, Gravesono and Milan. Though the studio was a place where autonomous electronic pieces were recorded, this wasn't its main purpose. It was launched as a space for the creation of independent compositions, sounds illustrations for radio dramas, and soundtracks for theatre, film and dance.

PRES and electronic music studios abroad 
The Polish Radio Experimental Studio was often visited by cultural delegations coming to Poland and was one of the few electronic music studios operating behind the Iron Curtain. In 1951, the Studio for Electronic Music of the West German Radio (WDR) and Groupe de Recherche de Musique Concrète in Paris (GRMC) were established. In 1953, they were followed by Elektronisches Studio at the Technical University of Berlin (the premises were located within the British zone of occupation, later belonging to West Berlin). In 1954, Experimentalstudio in Gravesano, Switzerland was founded. The following year brought the opening of the Studio di fonologia musicale di Radio Milano and the Nippon Hoso Kyokai studio in Tokyo. The PRES was the seventh radio studio producing electronic music in the world.

"The Black Room" and early equipment 
The first machines installed to the studio were: a simple tone generator, a rectangular pulse generator, an oscillograph, a high-pass and low pass RFT filters, two Sander-Jansen SJ100K tape recorders (produced in the German Democratic Republic), and a Poland-produced mixing console with four output limiters. In the following years PRES systematically acquired new gear.

The studio's premises were located in the Polish Radio headquarters on Malczewskiego Street in Warsaw, in the 6x6 metre Black Room designed by Zofia and Oskar Hansen. The walls were made of black and red panels, sound proof on one side and sound absorbing on the other. The Black Room was an allusion to Oskar Hansen's open form. In 1986, PRES moved across the city to the Polish Radio building on Woronicza street.

Most important tracks 
The first autonomous track recorded in the Experimental Studio was composed by Włodzimierz Kotoński, and titled Study for a Cymbal Stroke (Etiuda konkretna - na jedno uderzenie w talerz) from 1959. The starting point for this 2 minute 41 seconds long track was the sound of a Turkish cymbal struck by a soft drumstick. Kotoński drew from the tradition of musique concrète and Anton Webern's serialism.

Krzysztof Penderecki based his Death Brigade  on Leon Weliczker's diary. Wieliczker was a prisoner of Lviv Janowska Concentration Camp, where to cover up the German crimes, he would dig out and burn the bodies of those they had killed. The adaptation of the text comprised recordings of a heartbeat, and samples of an orchestra playing both piercing and low frequency sounds, all of which was far from illustrative. Eugeniusz Rudnik commented on it: “The greatness of Penderecki was us not getting carried away by naturalism. We didn’t represent skulls breaking in the flames. [...] Instead, we did a subtle, smart and delicate multiplication of the actor’s lines  […]”.

Symphony. Electronic Music (Symfonia. Muzyka Elektroniczna) by Bogusław Schaeffer is one of the most interesting examples of tracks produced in the PRES. Instead of “working with the sound” in the studio, the composer designed graphic vertical scores, and included a detailed legend instructing the sound engineer - Bohdan Mazurek – to act accordingly to the work environment. He was obligated to release a faithful production, no matter what studio he would be working in. Schaefer did not object to the idea of producing the track in a different place (including a potential “studio of the future”), neither did he define the instrumentation. He only determined the parameters. In recent years, the reinterpretations of Schaeffer's track were performed by Barbara Okoń-Makowska, Dominik Kowalczyk (Wolfram) and Thomas Lehn.

Skalary by Eugeniusz Rudnik is a multi-version piece - it can be played from start to finish and from finish to start, at different speeds, as well as with altered left and right channel distribution. Any setting is possible. When in 1965, a delegation of Soviet composers were invited to visit Poland during the Warsaw Autumn Festival, they fitted in with the conservative, socialist-realist style, restricted by communist party rules. Polish Radio had appointed Eugeniusz Rudnik to present the PRES's technical capabilities. As he was playing an excerpt from a track, one delegate asked him with a sneer: “Would it sound just as bad, if you played it backwards?”. Rudnik didn't react at the time, but a year later he recorded Skalary - a composition sounding equally well no matter how it's played.

Andrzej Dobrowolski's Passacaglia was an attempt to create a baroque form of inference and sounds considered to be musical scraps. The track is subtitled “for forty out of five", a reference to the forty sound objects derived from five initial drum noises.

Composers gathered around the Polish Radio Experimental Studio 
A whole range of Polish and foreign composers came through PRES. Produced here were tracks of: Włodzimierz Kotoński, Andrzej Dobrowolski, Tomasz Sikorski, Eugeniusz Rudnik, Krzysztof Penderecki, Zbigniew Wiszniewski, Bohdan Mazurek, Bogusław Schaeffer, as well as Arne Nordheim, Szábolcs Esztényi, Lejaren Hiller, the KEW Group (Elżbieta Sikora, Krzysztof Knittel, Wojciech Michniewski), Magdalena Długosz, Tomasz Stańko, Paweł Szymański, Andrzej Bieżan, Marek Chołoniewski, and Krzesimir Dębski.

Bibliography 

 Studio Eksperyment, Leksykon, Fundacja Bęc Zmiana, Warszawa 2012, 
 Witold Rudziński, Muzyka naszego stulecia, Wydawnictwa Szkolne i Pedagogiczne, 1995 
 Włodzimierz Kotoński, Muzyka elektroniczna, Polskie Wydawnictwo Muzyczne, 2002 
 Dźwięki elektrycznego ciała. Eksperymenty w sztuce i muzyce w Europie Wschodniej 1957-1984 - red. David Crowley i Daniel Muzyczuk, Muzeum Sztuki w Łodzi, 2012, 
Krzysztof Szlifirski, New Technology and the Training of Composers in Experimental Music, 1970. Music and Technology. UNESCO/La revue Musicale, Stockholm & Paris, 1970. Prepared for UNESCO on the basis of the papers and reports of the meeting on Music and Technology, in Stockholm, Sweden in June 1970, la Revue Musicale, Paris. 13 papers delivered at the meeting.

References

External links 
 The Story Behind the Experimental Music Haven that Escaped Communist Censorship
 Zuzanna Solakiewicz, 15 Corners of the World film
 Uncovering the Soul of the Polish Radio Experimental Studio (Short film with English subtitles)
8 Game-Changing Film Soundtracks By The Polish Radio Experimental Studio
Interview with Eugeniusz Rudnik conducted by Zuzanna Solakiewicz (in Polish)
PRES on Moma.org
When Experimental Music Met Martial Law

Polskie Radio
1957 establishments in Poland
2004 disestablishments in Poland
Recording studios in Poland
Experimental Music Studios